Ancient Greek grammar is morphologically complex and preserves several features of Proto-Indo-European morphology. Nouns, adjectives, pronouns, articles, numerals and especially verbs are all highly inflected.

A complication of Greek grammar is that different Greek authors wrote in different dialects, all of which have slightly different grammatical forms (see Ancient Greek dialects). For example, the history of Herodotus and medical works of Hippocrates are written in Ionic, the poems of Sappho in Aeolic, and the odes of Pindar in Doric; the poems of Homer are written in a mixed dialect, mostly Ionic, with many archaic and poetic forms. The grammar of Koine Greek (the Greek lingua franca spoken in the Hellenistic and later periods) also differs slightly from classical Greek. This article primarily discusses the morphology and syntax of Attic Greek, that is the Greek spoken at Athens in the century from 430 BC to 330 BC, as exemplified in the historical works of Thucydides and Xenophon, the comedies of Aristophanes, the philosophical dialogues of Plato, and the speeches of Lysias and Demosthenes.

Writing system

Alphabet 

Ancient Greek is written in its own alphabet, which is derived from the Phoenician alphabet. There are 24 letters, namely:

Inscriptions of the classical period show that at that time Greek was written entirely in capital letters, with no spaces between the words. The use of the lower-case cursive letters developed gradually.

Two punctuation marks are used in Greek texts which are not found in English: the colon, which consists of a dot raised above the line (  ) and the Greek question-mark, which looks like the English semicolon (  ).

This is known as iota subscript. When the main letter is capitalized, the iota can be written alongside instead, as in  "Hades"; this is known as iota adscript.

It is a convention in Ancient Greek texts that a capital letter is not written at the beginning of a sentence (except in some texts to indicate the beginning of direct speech). However, capital letters are used for the initial letter of names. Where a name starts with a rough breathing, as in  "Hermes", it is the initial vowel, not the breathing, which is made capital.

The lower-case letter  ("sigma") is written  at the end of a word, otherwise , e.g.  "wise",  "we are".

Diacritics

Breathings 
Written over the letter , it indicates that the  sound is voiceless: . At the beginning of a word, the letters  and  always have the rough breathing.
It is used on any word which starts with a vowel, e.g. "I".

When a word starts with a diphthong, e.g.  "I find", the breathing goes on the second of the two vowels.

A sign similar to a smooth breathing, called a coronis, is used to show when two words have joined together by a process called crasis ("mixing"), e.g.

Accents 

Written accents, marking the tonic syllables of Greek words, appear to have been invented in the 3rd century BC, but only became commonly used in the 2nd century AD.

However, if the last vowel of the word is long (with certain exceptions), the acute cannot go further from the end than the penultimate syllable. Compare  "man" vs.  "of a man". It is usually accepted that in classical Greek the accent was a pitch accent, that is, the accented syllable was pronounced on a higher pitch than the other syllables of the word. The accent is believed to have changed to a stress accent by about the 2nd century AD.
However, the acute remains when a punctuation mark follows, e.g. "tell him, Nicias", or before an enclitic word such as  "to me", e.g. "tell me, Socrates". The exact pronunciation of the grave accent is disputed, but it is quite likely that it often represented absence of high pitch, i.e. normal pitch. However, there is some evidence from Greek music that in some circumstances the grave was pronounced with a degree of high pitch, for example when a pronoun with a grave such as  "me too" was emphasised.
 The circumflex (Greek:  (perispōménē)), displayed as either a tilde ( ˜ ) or an inverted breve ( ˆ ) is used only on long vowels. It is typically found (a) where a long-vowel penultimate syllable which has the accent is followed by a short-vowel final syllable (e.g.  "people"); (b) where a contraction of an accented vowel plus an unaccented vowel has taken place: e.g.:  >  "he" or "she loves"; (c) in the genitive plural of all 1st declension nouns and all 3rd declension nouns of the type  e.g.  "of sailors",  "of walls"; (d) in the genitive and the dative case of the article and of all nouns and adjectives whose final syllable is accented, e.g. nominative  "a sound", but genitive , dative . The circumflex appears to have indicated a fall from a high pitch to a low pitch on the same vowel, and quite often in Greek musical fragments it is represented by two notes, the first higher than the second.

General outline

Nouns

Gender
In Ancient Greek, all nouns, including proper nouns, are classified according to grammatical gender as masculine, feminine, or neuter. The gender of a noun is shown by the definite article (the word  "the") which goes with it, or by any adjective which describes it:
 "the god" (masculine)
 "the woman" (feminine)
 "the gift" (neuter)

Words referring to males are usually masculine, females are usually feminine, but there are some exceptions, such as  "the child" (neuter). Inanimate objects can be of any gender, for example  "the river" is masculine,  "the city" is feminine, and  "the tree" is neuter.

A peculiarity of neuter words in Ancient Greek is that when a plural neuter noun or pronoun is used as the subject of a verb, the verb is singular, for example: 
.
.
These things are (lit. "is") all beautiful.

Number
Nouns, adjectives, and pronouns also vary as to number. They can be singular, dual (referring to two people or things), or plural (referring to two or more):
 "the god" (singular)
 "the two gods" (dual)
 "the gods" (plural)

As can be seen from the above examples, the difference between singular, dual, and plural is generally shown in Greek by changing the ending of the noun, and the article also changes for different numbers.

The dual number is used for a pair of things, for example  "his two hands",  "of the two walls". It is, however, not very common; for example, the dual article  is found no more than 90 times in the comedies of Aristophanes, and only 3 times in the historian Thucydides. There are special verb endings for the dual as well.

Cases
Nouns, pronouns, adjectives and the article in Ancient Greek also change according to their function in the sentence. For example:
 "the woman" (subject)
 "of the woman"
 "to, for, or with the woman"
 "the woman" (direct object)
These different forms are called different cases of the noun. The four principal cases are called the nominative (Subject), genitive (of), dative (to, for, with), and accusative (direct object).

In addition, some nouns also have a separate vocative case, used for addressing a person:
 "madam!"

Frequently a vocative is preceded by the word  "o". Where there is no separate vocative case (which is the case for all plural nouns), the nominative is used instead.

The order in which the cases are given differs in American and British textbooks. In American grammars, such as H. W. Smyth's Greek Grammar (1920), the order is Nom. – Gen. –  Dat. – Acc. – Voc.; in grammars produced in Britain and countries formerly under British influence the order is Nom. – Voc. – Acc. – Gen. – Dat.

Prepositions
The accusative, genitive, and dative cases are also used after prepositions, for example:
 "to the woman" (accusative)
 "away from the woman" (genitive)
 "along with the woman" (dative)

Some prepositions can be followed by more than one case depending on the meaning. For example,  means "with" when followed by a noun in the genitive, but "after" if followed by an accusative.

Declensions
Nouns differ as to their endings. They are divided into three different groups, called declensions, according to these endings and the endings of the other cases:
 "the goddesses" – 1st declension
 "the gods" – 2nd declension
 "the women" – 3rd declension

1st declension nouns tend to be feminine (but there are some exceptions such as  "a soldier"), 2nd declension nouns tend to be masculine (again with exceptions).

Neuter nouns
They are divided into the 2nd and 3rd declensions according to the endings of their genitive and dative cases, which are the same as those of masculine nouns.
 "the trees" – 2nd declension
 "the walls" – 3rd declension

Neuter nouns also differ from masculine and feminine nouns in that they do not have a separate ending for the accusative case, but the nominative, vocative, and accusative are always identical.

Definite article 

Attic Greek has a definite article, but no indefinite article. Thus  "the city", but  "a city". The definite article agrees with its associated noun in number, gender and case.

The article is more widely used in Greek than the word the in English. For example, proper names often take a definite article (e.g. , ho Sōkrátēs, "Socrates"), as do abstract nouns (e.g. It is also used in combination with possessive adjectives and demonstratives in phrases such as  "my city" and  "this city".

Adjectives are usually placed between the article and noun, e.g.  "my father", but sometimes after the noun, in which case the article is repeated before the adjective:  "my father". Dependent genitive noun phrases can also be positioned between the article and noun, for example  "the nature of man" (Plato), although other positions are possible, e.g.  "the soul of man" (Plato).

Another use of the article in Ancient Greek is with an infinitive, adjective, adverb, or a participle to make a noun, for example,  "wrong-doing, doing wrong";  "the beautiful, beauty";  "the events, the things that happened";   "the people present".

In earlier Greek, for instance Homeric Greek, there was no definite article as such, the corresponding forms still having their original use as demonstrative pronouns. The article is also omitted in classical Greek tragedy (except when the meaning is "that"), but it is used in comedy.

The definite article is declined thus:

Adjectives 
Ancient Greek adjectives agree with the nouns they modify in case, gender, and number. There are several different declension patterns for adjectives, and most of them resemble various noun declensions. The boundary between adjectives and nouns is somewhat fuzzy in Ancient Greek: adjectives are frequently used on their own without a noun, and Greek grammarians called both of them , meaning "name" or "noun".

Verbs 

Verbs have four moods (indicative, imperative, subjunctive and optative), three voices (active, middle and passive), as well as three persons (first, second and third) and three numbers (singular, dual, and plural). The dual, which exists only in the 2nd and 3rd persons (you both, they both), is rarely used.

Indicative mood 
The indicative mood is the form of the verb used for making statements of fact.

In the indicative mood, verbs have up to seven tenses. These are as follows, using the regular verb  "I teach":

Primary tenses:
 Present:  "I teach", "I am teaching", "I have been teaching"
 Future:  "I will teach"
 Perfect:  "I have taught"
 Future perfect:  "I will have taught" (very rare)

Secondary tenses:
 Imperfect:  "I was teaching", "I began teaching", "I used to teach", "I taught", "I had been teaching"
 Aorist:  "I taught", "I have taught"
 Pluperfect:  "I had taught" (rare)

Of these, the imperfect and pluperfect tenses are found in the indicative only.

Tense stems 
In order to make the secondary tenses of the indicative an augment (usually consisting of the prefix ) is added at the beginning of the verb, e.g.  "I order" but  "I ordered". When the verb begins with a vowel, this augment is realised as a lengthening and often change of quality of the vowel, e.g.  "I lead" but  "I was leading". This augment is found only in the indicative, not in the other moods or in the participle or infinitives.

To make the perfect and pluperfect tenses, the first consonant of the verb's root is usually repeated with the vowel , for example:  "I write, I have written",  "I free, I have freed",  "I teach, I have taught" (all present, perfect). This is called "reduplication". Some verbs, however, where reduplication is not convenient, use an augment instead, e.g.  "I had, I have had" (aorist, perfect),  "I find, I have found" (present, perfect). This reduplication or perfect-tense augment appears in every part of the verb, not in the indicative only.

Other moods 
As well as the indicative mood, Ancient Greek had an imperative, subjunctive, and optative mood.

 The imperative mood is found in three tenses (present, aorist, and perfect). The aorist is used when the speaker wants something done at once, e.g.  "give it to me at once!" A 3rd person imperative is also possible in Greek:  "someone take her away!" The present imperative is used when the command is general:  "don't lie, but (always) tell the truth".
 The subjunctive mood is found in the same three tenses. In independent clauses it states what the speaker suggests "should" happen; it is also used for deliberative questions ("what should I do?"). Another very common use is in indefinite conditional or temporal ("time") clauses, such as "if this should happen" or "whenever this happens". It can also be used to make purpose clauses and to express fears ("I fear that this may happen"). "let's go".
 The optative mood is used for wishes ("may it happen!"), and also for referring to events in a hypothetical future situation ("this would happen"). Other common uses are in indefinite temporal clauses in past time ("whenever it happened"), and to express purpose and fears in past time. Finally, the optative is also used to express indirect speech in past time. "may it not happen!"

Voices 
Greek verbs can be found in any of three voices: active, passive, and middle.

A passive verb can be defined as one which refers to an action which is done by someone or by something (even if the person by whom it was done is not expressly stated).
 Middle verbs are those with the  endings which are not passive in meaning. Often they refer to actions which someone does to themselves or for their own benefit, such as  "I get washed",  "I stand", or  "I stop". Some middle verbs such as  "I fight" refer to reciprocal actions done by people to each other.

Often middle verbs have no active counterpart, such as  "I become" or  "I receive". These verbs are called deponent verbs.

The forms of the verb for middle and passive voices largely overlap, except in the aorist and future tenses where there are separate forms for middle and passive.

Infinitives 

Ancient Greek has a number of infinitives. They can be of any voice (active, middle, or passive) and in any of five tenses (present, aorist, perfect, future, and future perfect).

The infinitive can be used with or without the definite article. With the article (which is always neuter singular), it has a meaning similar to the English gerund:  "wrong-doing", "doing wrong".

When used without the article, the infinitive has a number of different uses; for example, just as in English it is used dependent on verbs meaning "want", "am able", "it is necessary", "it is possible" and so on:
.
.
I want to speak about these things.

In Greek the infinitive can also be used in indirect commands (e.g. "he ordered him to...", "he persuaded him to...") where the main verb is followed by an object plus infinitive:
.
.
He invited Xenophon to come in.

The distinction between the present and aorist infinitive in a context like the above is one of aspect rather than of time. In both of the above examples, the aorist infinitive is used, implying "to do at once", as opposed to "to do in general" or "regularly".

Another frequent use of the infinitive is to make an indirect statement, especially after verbs such as   "I say" and  "I think". As above, there are two constructions, one where the plain infinitive is used (this happens when the subject of the infinitive and the subject of the main verb are the same, i.e. coreferential):

.
.
I think that I will do this without difficulty (lit. "I think to be going to do this").

The other is where the subject of the infinitive and the subject of the main verb are different. In this type, the subject of the infinitive is put in the accusative case, as in the following example:
.
.
They say that the soul of man is immortal (lit. "to be immortal").

Although the infinitive was widely used in Ancient Greek, it gradually fell out of use in spoken Greek, and in modern Greek it no longer exists. Instead of "I want to go", a construction with the subjunctive mood is used equivalent to "I want that I go".

Participles 

Ancient Greek makes frequent use of participles, which are verbal adjectives. Participles are found in all three voices (Active, Middle, and Passive) and in five different tenses (present, aorist, perfect, future, and future perfect). Because they are adjectival in form, they also come in three genders (masculine, feminine, and neuter), three numbers (singular, dual, and plural), and four different cases (nominative, accusative, genitive, and dative). Despite being adjectival, they also function as verbs, and can, for example, take a direct object like any other verb. For example, from the verb  "I free or untie" come the following participles (cited here in the masculine singular nominative):
 (present) "freeing", "untying"
 (aorist) "after freeing", "having freed"
 (perfect) "having (already) freed"
 (future) "going to free", "in order to free"

Participles are used in various ways in Greek. Often, for example, the first of two verbs is replaced by an aorist participle:
.
.
After saying this, he sat down.

A participle can also be used with the definite article, with the meaning "the one who" or "those who":

Who are the people who say this?

A participle can also be used dependent on certain verbs, for example, verbs of perception, representing an independent clause (this is known as the "supplementary" participle):
.
.
He realised that he was not going to escape the disease.

Verbal adjectives

Verbal adjective in 
The gerundive is a verbal adjective that indicates the necessity for the action of the verb to be performed. It takes the nominative endings , declining like a normal first/second declension adjective.

 →  ( → ) "to be stopped"
 →  ( → ) "to be taken"

There are two ways of using the gerundive in Greek. One is passively, somewhat like the gerundive in Latin, with the person who has to do the action in the dative case:

.
.
There is another river which we must cross (lit. to be crossed for us).

The other is actively, and impersonally, with the neuter singular ending ; in this form it may take an object. Again the person who has to do the action, if mentioned, is put in the dative case:
.
.
It is necessary for us to choose death with glory.

In some sentences either interpretation is possible:
.
.
The fort must be captured / it is necessary to capture the fort.

Although the Greek gerundive resembles the Latin one, it is used far less frequently. Another way of expressing necessity in Greek is to use the impersonal verb  "it is necessary", followed by an accusative and infinitive:
.
.
It is necessary for him to die (he must die).

Verbal adjective in 
"hidden"), and in other verbs expresses possibility (e.g. "possible").

Time and aspect 

One of the most notable features that Ancient Greek has inherited from Proto-Indo-European is its use of verb "tense" to express both tense proper (present, past, or future) and the aspect of the time (as ongoing, simply taking place, or completed with a lasting result). The aspectual relation is expressed by the tenses in all the moods, while the temporal relation is only expressed in the indicative and to a more limited extent in the other moods (also called the dependent moods).

With regard to the time relation that they express in the indicative, the seven tense-aspects are divided into two categories:
 Primary: denoting present or future time. These are the present tense (in its ordinary use), perfect, future tense and the rare future perfect.
 Secondary (also called historical), denoting past time. The secondary tenses are the imperfect, pluperfect, and the aorist (in its ordinary uses).
This classification, which properly applies only to forms of the indicative, is also extended to the dependent moods in the cases where they express the same time relation as the indicative. The time relation expressed by a verb's tense may be present, past or future with reference to the time of the utterance or with reference to the time of another verb with which the verb in question is connected. Compare for instance  "it's true" with  "I said that it was true" or "I said 'it's true'".

A verb also expresses one of three possible aspects, irrespective of the mood it may be in:
 Imperfective aspect: indicating an ongoing, continuous, or repeated action. The present and the imperfect convey this aspect.
 Perfective aspect (traditionally also called aorist aspect in Greek grammar): indicating that the action is started and concluded at the same time, or that the action is focused on a single point in time, or that the action simply occurs without reference to its duration or lasting effect. The aorist conveys this aspect in all moods.
 Perfect (traditionally also often called perfective, but not to be confused with the above): indicating that the action is completed with a result that remains into the time being considered. The perfect (in all moods) as well as the pluperfect and future perfect carry this combination of relative tense and aspect.

Mood of the dependent verb 

The rules on mood sequence (consecutio modorum) determine the mood of verbs in subordinate clauses in a way analogous to but more flexible than the Latin rules on time sequence (consecutio temporum) that determine their tense.

Putting aside special cases and exceptions, these rules can be formulated as follows:
 In dependent sentences, where the construction allows both the subjunctive and the optative, the subjunctive is used if the leading verb is primary, and the optative if it is secondary. E.g. , "they do whatever they want"; but , "they did whatever they wanted".
 Similarly, where the construction allows both the indicative and the optative, the indicative follows primary, and the optative follows secondary tenses. E.g.

See also 

Koine Greek grammar
Modern Greek grammar
Prosody (Greek)

References

External links 

 glottothèque – Ancient Indo-European Grammars online, an online collection of videos on Ancient Indo-European languages, including video lectures on Ancient Greek grammar

 

Greek grammar
Ancient Greek

de:Altgriechische Grammatik